HKK Brotnjo Čitluk (Croatian: Hrvatski košarkaški klub Brotnjo Čitluk, English: Croatian Basketball Club Brotnjo Čitluk) is a basketball team from the town of Čitluk, Bosnia and Herzegovina. It was established in 1977.

The club previously played in the Basketball Championship of Bosnia and Herzegovina and the A1 Liga of Herceg-Bosne. The club also participated in the Korać Cup in 1995 and 1998–99.

Honours

League
Basketball Championship of Bosnia and Herzegovina:
Winner (1): 1997
Herzeg-Bosnia Basketball League:
Winner (6): 1995, 1996, 1997, 1999, 2000, 2006, 2010, 2013

Cups
Basketball Cup of Bosnia and Herzegovina:
Winner (1): 1997
Runner-up (2): 1999, 2002
Cup of Herzeg-Bosnia:
Winner (4): 1997, 1998, 2000, 2001

Notable players

 Ivica Zubac
 Zoran Planinić

External links 
 HKK Brotnjo website 

Basketball teams in Bosnia and Herzegovina
Basketball teams established in 1977
Basketball teams in Yugoslavia
Croatian sports clubs outside Croatia